Megiddo may refer to:

Places and sites in Israel
 Tel Megiddo, site of an ancient city in Israel's Jezreel valley
 Megiddo Airport, a domestic airport in Israel
 Megiddo church (Israel)
 Megiddo, Israel, a kibbutz in Israel
 Megiddo Junction, a motorway junction in northern Israel

USA churches
 Megiddo Mission, Rochester, NY
 Megiddo Church, Rochester, NY

People
 Nimrod Megiddo, mathematician and computer scientist

Fiction
 Megiddo: The Omega Code 2, a 2001 American film
 "Megiddo", the 65th chapter and 34th episode of That Time I Got Reincarnated as a Slime
 Prince Megiddo, a character in the Japanese television series Kagaku Sentai Dynaman
 Aradia and Damara Megido, characters from the webcomic Homestuck

Music
 Megiddo (EP), a 1997 EP by Satyricon
  Megiddo (Lauren Hoffman album), 1997
 Dawn of Megiddo, a song from the 1985 album To Mega Therion by the Swiss metal band Celtic Frost

Other uses
 Megiddo (battle honour), awarded to British Empire units that fought at the 1918 Battle of Megiddo 
 Project Megiddo, an FBI report on possible criminality associated with the new millennium
 Megiddo, a 1984 board game based on Pente designed by Steve Baldwin
 Megido, a predecessor project to Lazarus, an implementation of the programming language Pascal

See also
 Battle of Megiddo (disambiguation)